CHFM-FM (Star 95.9) is a Canadian radio station broadcasting at 95.9 FM in Calgary, Alberta. Owned by Rogers Sports & Media, the station broadcasts an adult contemporary format. CHFM's studios are located on 7th Avenue Southwest in Downtown Calgary, while its transmitter is located on Patina Hill Drive Southwest in West Calgary.

As of Winter 2020, CHFM is the 4th-most-listened-to radio station in the Calgary market according to a PPM data report released by Numeris.

History
CHFM was Calgary's first FM radio station when it signed on the air in 1962, as a beautiful music station. Moffat Communications (owners of the legendary CKXL in Calgary) purchased the station in 1972. The station would move to an adult contemporary format during the 1980s as FM 96.

In 1992, Moffat Communications sold CHFM to Rogers Broadcasting as part of the company's sale of their Radio division. Shortly after, the station rebranded as Lite 96 CHFM, quickly becoming one of the most popular stations in Calgary.

CHFM would become Lite 95.9 in 2011 with a slight format change to Hot AC, away from their long running soft music tradition.

The station rebranded as Kiss 95.9 on December 26, 2013. In December 2017, the station returned to AC and rebranded using its call letters, with branding modelled after sister station CHFI in Toronto.

In February 2022, the station rebranded as Star 95.9 and introduced a new on-air lineup.

Former logos

References

External links

CHFM History - Canadian Communications Foundation

HFM
HFM
HFM
Radio stations established in 1962
1962 establishments in Alberta